The Warrior (Italian: Maciste alpino) is a 1916 film directed by Luigi Romano Borgnetto and Luigi Maggi and starring Bartolomeo Pagano in the role of Maciste .

Production

This is one of the first films starring the character of Maciste, who Giovanni Pastrone created in 1914 Cabiria. It saw huge success in Italy and abroad and whose name is due to Gabriele D'Annunzio who thus created a neologism that is still in use today. The warrior is the best-known and critically praised film of the Maciste series. 

The film is not far from what will be (with the exception of Maciste in hell) a Escapism series with the horrors of the first world war is not really addressed.

See also

Bibliography 
Notes

References 
 - Total pages: 240
 - Total pages: 432

External links
 

1916 films
1916 drama films
1910s Italian-language films
Italian silent feature films 
Italian black-and-white films
Films directed by Luigi Maggi